Gettorf is a small city in the district Rendsburg-Eckernförde in the middle between Kiel and Eckernförde.

The city has an estimated population of 7563 residents and an area of 9,35 km2.

History 
Gettorf was probably founded by Jutian (de) and Saxon settlers (de) between 1190 and 1220 and was first mentioned in a writing in 1259 as “Ghetdorpe”.

Economy and transport 
The economy of Gettorf is characterized by small craft businesses and medium-sized service and commercial enterprises that have taken a great importance for the supply of the surrounding area. Agriculture also plays an important role.

Gettorf is connected to the national road network by a bypass of the federal highway 76 (de) completed in 2004.

Since 2020 Gettorf also has an important Tesla outlet with showrooms.

Landmarks 
In the center of the village is the medieval St. Jürgen Church (de). The construction began before 1250 and was completed with the 64 m high church tower around 1494.

In the pedestrian zone at Alexanderplatz, a small devil statue recalls an old legend, according to which the devil threw a rock, the devil's stone (de), on the church tower, which was diverted by God and thus only grazed the tower, which is why it is now slightly crooked. This Teufelsstein can be found outside Gettorf in the municipality of Lindau on the road between Revensdorf and Großkönigsförde. 

Also, very popular for the village is its zoo with more than 850 animals that is very popular for both children and adults and was opened more than 50 years ago.

Sources 

Rendsburg-Eckernförde